Home Invasion: In Concert at the Royal Albert Hall is the second live Blu-ray/DVD and third live album by progressive rock musician Steven Wilson, released on 2 November 2018. It was filmed on the final night of Wilson's three-night residency at the Royal Albert Hall in London, which was part of the To the Bone tour. A 5-LP Vinyl edition was released on March 29, 2019 with six extra tracks not present on the CD edition.

Track listing
All tracks written by Steven Wilson.

Personnel
Adapted from liner notes.

Performers
Steven Wilson – vocals, guitar, keyboards, bass
Ninet Tayeb – vocals
Alex Hutchings – guitar, backing vocals
Nick Beggs (introduced as 'Sir Nicholas Beggs') – bass guitar, stick, backing vocals, keyboards
Craig Blundell – drums
Adam Holzman – keyboards

Additional personnel
James Russell – director
Andy Derbyshire – producer
Nick Wheeler – photographic direction
Tim Woolcott – editor
Steven Wilson – audio mixing
Lasse Hoile, Jess Cope and Steven Wilson – video screen content

Charts

References

2018 live albums
2018 video albums
Steven Wilson albums